Antonella Spaggiari (born 27 April 1957) is an Italian politician.

She was a member of the Italian Communist Party, serving also as party secretary and group leader at the city council of Reggio Emilia. She was elected mayor of Reggio Emilia to replace Giulio Fantuzzi and served from 1991 to 2004.

She was appointed director of the Manodori Foundation in 2004.

Biography
Antonella Spaggiari was born in Reggio Emilia, Italy in 1957.

See also
 List of mayors of Reggio Emilia

References 

1957 births
Living people
People from Reggio Emilia
Italian Communist Party politicians
21st-century Italian women politicians
20th-century Italian women politicians
Mayors of Reggio Emilia